Nilay is a female given name of Turkish origin. Ay means moon and Nil means the river Nile in Turkish language. The name means Moon of the Nile. People named Nilay include:

 Nilay Aydogan (1992–2023), Turkish basketball player
 Nilay Erkal (born 1999), Turkish long-distance swimmer
 Nilay Esen Ersun (born 1987), Turkish marathon runner
 Nilay Konar (born 1980), Turkish volleyball player
 Nilay Özdemir (born 1985), Turkish volleyball player
 Nilay Patel, American technology journalist
 Nilay Yiğit (born 1979), Turkish basketball player

Turkish feminine given names